Kpanga is a village in the north-east of the Democratic Republic of the Congo, near the borders with the Central African Republic and Southern Sudan. In May 2010 it was reported that a senior United Nations official is investigating a massacre of over 100 people that took place in February 2010. The massacre was carried out by Ugandan rebels from the Lord's Resistance Army.

See also
 List of cities in the Democratic Republic of the Congo

References

Populated places in Nord-Ubangi